The Roberts Institute of Art, formerly operating as David Roberts Art Foundation (DRAF), is a non-profit contemporary arts organisation based in London. It commissions pioneering performance art, collaborates with national partners on exhibitions and works to research and share the David and Indrė Roberts Collection. 

Art collector David Roberts founded the organisation in 2007 and since then it has welcomed over 135,000 visitors, partnered with over 100 museums and organisations and worked together with over 1,000 artists.

History
Founded in London, UK in 2007, the Roberts Institute of Art operated as the David Roberts Art Foundation (DRAF) until April 2021. Named after its founder David Roberts, DRAF was set up as a platform for artistic and critical experimentation and to share what was then known as the David Roberts Collection and is now called the David and Indrė Roberts Collection.

DRAF originally ran an exhibition space on Great Titchfield Street, central London, presenting group and solo exhibitions and hosting talks and performances. The annual Evening of Performances (2008–ongoing), which showcases and commissions live work by artists, musicians and choreographers, was inaugurated here. In 2017 a tenth-anniversary edition of Evening of Performances took place at the historic music venue, KOKO, London and included performances by Lina Lapelytė, Hannah Quinlan and Rosie Hastings, Jamila Johnson-Small, Kris Lemsalu and Marvin Gaye Chetwynd. The Curators' Series (2009–2020) was also established to support curatorial research and practices. Over its 11-year period, DRAF invited independent curators, duos and organisations, including Arcadia Missa (UK), Christine Eyene (Cameroon), Mihnea Mircan (Romania), Pablo Leon de la Barra (Mexico) and Raimundas Malasauskas (Lithuanian), to develop and deliver thematic exhibitions with newly commissioned works.

In 2012 the organisation moved to a former 19th-century furniture factory in Camden, north London. In this larger space, DRAF supported the research, development and display of live-art practices, presented exhibitions and established a forum for discussion and knowledge sharing.

Committed to championing performance and research from the outset, between 2015 and 2017 the Camden gallery also housed DRAF Studio, a dedicated space for live projects which brought together and hosted in residence artists, choreographers, musicians, writers and peer organisations to discuss and develop live work and installation.

After DRAF's ten-year anniversary, the Camden space closed in late 2017 with the aim of sharing the organisation's programming more widely.

David and Indrė Roberts Collection
The Roberts Institute of Art manages the David and Indrė Roberts Collection, a body of more than 2,500 artworks by 850 artists. The collection is rooted in a passion for contemporary art, an ambition to share extraordinary work by some of the world's most influential artists and to support artists at different stages of their careers. The Roberts Institute of Art is committed to sharing it with a wide range of audiences. Works from the David and Indrė Roberts Collection have been shown publicly in numerous shows nationally and internationally, including at the Centre Pompidou (Paris), the Guggenheim Museum Bilbao, the Irish Museum of Modern Art (Dublin), the Museum of Contemporary Art Chicago, the National Portrait Gallery (London), the Scottish National Gallery of Modern Art (Edinburgh), the Solomon R. Guggenheim Museum (New York) and Tate Modern (London). The collection has been the subject of in-depth exhibitions at the Hepworth Wakefield (2013) and Mostyn, Wales (2018).

Structure
The David Roberts Art Foundation Limited (trading as The Roberts Institute of Art) is a registered charity in England and Wales (No. 1119738) and a company limited by guarantee registered in England and Wales (No. 6051439) and is supported by Edinburgh House Estates Limited.

External links

References

Non-profit organisations based in London
Arts centres in London
Arts organizations established in 2007
2007 establishments in England